The 1908–09 season was Sport Lisboa e Benfica's fifth season in existence and the club's third competitive season.

Campeonato de Lisboa

Table

Matches

Player statistics

|}

References

 

S.L. Benfica seasons
S.L. Benfica season
S.L. Benfica season
1908–09 in Portuguese football